Fort Fremont Hospital, located in Beaufort County, South Carolina, is significant due to its association with the nearby fort. The Colonial Revival building was built around 1906 as a replacement for the original hospital for the garrison.  It is worth noting that the War Department planned to phase out the post at Fort Fremont Battery as early as 1906, the year that Fort Fremont Hospital was built. Since 1930, the year that the fort was decommissioned, the hospital has been privately owned. Fort Fremont Hospital was listed in the National Register of Historic Places on May 26, 1989.

References

Hospital buildings completed in 1906
Hospital buildings on the National Register of Historic Places in South Carolina
Colonial Revival architecture in South Carolina
Buildings and structures in Beaufort County, South Carolina
National Register of Historic Places in Beaufort County, South Carolina
1906 establishments in South Carolina